Block paving, also known as brick paving, is a commonly used decorative method of creating a pavement or hardstanding. The main benefit of bricks over other materials is that individual bricks can later be lifted up and replaced. This allows for remedial work to be carried out under the surface of the paving without leaving a lasting mark once the paving bricks have been replaced.  Typical areas of use would be for driveways, pavement, patios, town centres, pedestrian precincts and more commonly in road surfacing. Bricks are typically made of concrete or clay, though other composite materials are also used. Each has its own means of construction. The biggest difference is the way they set hard ready for use. A clay brick has to be fired in a kiln to bake the brick hard.  A concrete brick has to be allowed to set.  The concrete paving bricks are a porous form of brick formed by mixing small stone hardcore, dyes, cement and sand and other materials in various amounts. Many block paving manufacturing methods are now allowing the use of recycled materials in the construction of the paving bricks, such as crushed glass and crushed old building rubble.

There are many different laying patterns that can be achieved using block paving.  The most common of these is the herringbone pattern.  This pattern is the strongest of the block paving bonds as it offers the most interlock, therefore making it a good choice for driveways and road surfacing.  A herringbone pattern can be created by setting the blocks at either 45 degrees or 90 degrees to the perpendicular.  Other popular types of pattern include stretcher bond and basketweave; with the latter being better suited to paved areas that will only receive light foot traffic, due to its weaker bond.

A commonly used base is 'cracker dust' or commonly known as crushed bluemetal. The advantage of using this in residential living is that it compacts a lot harder than yellow brickies sand, which prevents weeds and ants from coming through.

Concrete pavers 
Pavers come in a number of styles, shapes and tones. Pavers manufactured from concrete go well with flag, brick and concrete walkways or patios. If you reside in climates wherever winter temperatures dip below zero, concrete pavers are an honest selection. They are ready to stoppage well in extreme temperatures. Opt for pavers in shades like ochre, pink, bisque, white or sand. Pavers are available in hole, x-shape, y-shape, pentagon, polygon and fan styles.

See also
 Road surfacing

References

Pavements
Landscape architecture